Patrice Louise Rushen (born September 30, 1954) is an American jazz pianist and R&B singer. She is also a composer, record producer, multi-instrumentalist, songwriter, and music director.

Her 1982 single "Forget Me Nots" received a Grammy Award nomination for Best Female R&B Vocal Performance. The instrumental "Number One" from her album Straight from the Heart earned an additional Grammy nomination for best instrumental. Her 12th album Signature also received a Grammy nomination for best instrumental in 1998.

Rushen also serves as an ambassador for artistry in education at the Berklee College of Music and the chair of the popular music program at the USC Thornton School of Music.

Biography
Rushen is the elder of two daughters born to Allen and Ruth Rushen (former Director of California Department of Corrections). Patrice was three years old when she began playing the piano, and by the time she was six, she was giving classical recitals. In her teens, she attended Locke High School and later earned a degree in music from the University of Southern California.

After winning a competition at the age of 17 that enabled her to perform with her band at the Monterey Jazz Festival, Rushen signed with the Prestige label, releasing three albums with them – Prelusion (1974), Before the Dawn (1975), and Shout It Out (1977). In 1978, when she was 23, she began recording with Elektra.

Rushen married Marc St. Louis, a concert tour manager and live show production specialist, in 1986. They have one son, Cameron and one daughter named Jadyn. The name of her publishing company, Baby fingers Inc., is pulled from her nickname Babyfingers for her tiny hands. In 2005, Rushen received an honorary doctorate of Music degree from Berklee College of Music. She is the chair of popular music at USC and the ambassador of artistry in Education at the Berklee College of Music. She has served as the film composer for numerous movies, television shows and documentaries. She has been a member of jazz fusion band CAB, The Meeting (GRP Records) with Ndugu Chancler, Alphonso Johnson and Ernie Watts. Rushen is also a music director, having worked on various television events as well as Janet Jackson's world tour 'Janet'.

Her song "Hang It Up" was featured on the 2005 video game Fahrenheit.

Cultural impact
Rushen's songs are sampled often in other artists music. The chorus from "Forget Me Nots" was used as the music for the 1997 song "Men in Black". Rushen was credited as writer and composer, along with Will Smith and Terri McFadden. The same chorus can be heard in George Michael's song "Fastlove". "Forget Me Nots" previously found its way into the trampolining scene in the film Big. Her song "Haven't You Heard" was sampled in Kirk Franklin's Looking For You from the Norbit soundtrack. In 2021 her song "Forget Me Nots" was used in a dance challenge on TikTok.

Rushen was the first woman to serve as music director for the 46th, 47th, and 48th Grammy Awards. She was the only woman music director/conductor/arranger for a late-night show titled The Midnight Hour, which aired on CBS in 1990.

Awards

Grammy awards
Rushen has received three Grammy nominations.

Other awards
 Number One Record "Feels So Real", Radio & Records (R&R) National Chart - Writers: Patrice Rushen & Fred Washington, 1984
 ASCAP Songwriter's Award, 1988
 USC Black Student Assembly, Legacy of Excellence Award, 1992
 Crystal Award, American Women in Film, 1994
 ASCAP Award, Most Performed Song in Motion Pictures for 1997 for "Men in Black," 1998
 NAACP Image Award Nomination for Best Contemporary Jazz Recording for “Signature”, 1998
 Honorary Doctorate Berklee College of Music, 2005
 The California Jazz Foundation NICA award for lifetime achievement, 2019
 The Ramo Music Faculty Award, 2020
 Trailblazer Award, Salute Them Awards, 2021
 Hamilton Garrett Center for Music and Arts (Boston, MA), Make Them Hear You Award, 2023

Discography

Solo albums

Singles

Appearances
With Carlos Santana and Wayne Shorter
 Live at the 1988 Montreux Jazz Festival (Liberation Entertainment, 2007)
With The Meeting
 The Meeting (GRP, 1990)
 Update (Hip-Bop, 1995)
With Kenny Burrell
 Heritage (AudioSource, 1980)
With Herbie Hancock
 Lite Me Up (Columbia, 1982)
With Eddie Henderson
 Heritage (Blue Note, 1976)
 Comin' Through (Capitol, 1977)
With Sadao Watanabe

 Autumn Blow (Inner City Records, 1977) 

With Jean-Luc Ponty
 Upon the Wings of Music (Atlantic, 1975)
 Aurora (Atlantic, 1976)
With Letizia Gambi
 Introducing Letizia Gambi (Via Veneto Jazz, 2012)
With Wallace Roney
 A Place in Time (HighNote, 2016)
With Cindy Blackman
 Another Lifetime (4Q, 2010)

Filmography

 Agents of Change (2016)
 Burning Sands (2008)
 For One Night (2006, TV)
 Just a Dream (2002)
 Our America (2002, TV)
 Baby of the Family (2002)
 Piano, Bass and Drums (2002 Aix Entertainment, DVD Audio)
 The Killing Yard (2001, TV)
 Fire & Ice (2001, TV)
 Cora Unashamed (2000, TV)
 Ruby Bridges (1998, TV)
 America's Dream (1996, TV)
 A. Philip Randolph: For Jobs and Freedom (1996, TV)
 The Steve Harvey Show (1996) TV series (unknown episodes)
 The Midnight Hour (1990) TV series (unknown episodes)
 Without You I'm Nothing (1990)

 Hollywood Shuffle (1987)
 George Michael: I'm Your Man – A South Bank Show Special (2006, TV, writer: "Fastlove")
 Fahrenheit (2005, performer: "Hang It Up")
 Men in Black (1997, writer: "Men In Black")
 Waiting to Exhale (1995, performer: "And I Gave My Love to You")
 Big (1988, writer/performer: "Forget Me Nots")
 Dominick and Eugene (1988, performer: "Somewhere")
 TV in Black: The First Fifty Years (2004) Herself
 VH-1 Where Are They Now? Herself (One episode, 2002)
 100 Greatest Dance Songs of Rock & Roll (2000), TV series, Herself
 Monterey Jazz Festival: 40 Legendary Years (1998), Herself
 The Best of Robert Townsend & His Partners in Crime (1991) Herself
 Top of the Pops, Herself (One episode, 1982)
 Soul Train, Herself (One episode, 1981)
 American Bandstand, Herself (One episode, 1980)

Musical directing
 The 48th Annual Grammy Awards (2006, musical director)
 The 47th Annual Grammy Awards (2005, musical director)
 The 46th Annual Grammy Awards (2004, musical director)
 The 10th Annual Walk of Fame Honoring Smokey Robinson (2004, musical director)
 The 9th Annual Walk of Fame Honoring Aretha Franklin (2003, musical director)
 The 8th Annual Walk of Fame Honoring Stevie Wonder (2002, musical director)
 People's Choice Awards (1993, musical director)
 The Best of Robert Townsend & His Partners in Crime (1991, musical director)
 "No Strings" by "Sheena Easton", Rushen as record producer (1993)
 The Women of Brewster Place (1989, special musical consultant)
 "The Midnight Hour" (unknown episodes, 1990)
 Partners in Crime (1988, musical director)

References

Sources

External links
 
 
 
 
 Patrice Rushen 2012 Audio Interview at Soulinterviews.com
 Patrice Rushen Interview NAMM Oral History Program

1954 births
20th-century African-American women singers
African-American jazz pianists
American boogie musicians
American dance musicians
American disco singers
American funk keyboardists
American funk singers
American multi-instrumentalists
American jazz keyboardists
American rhythm and blues singer-songwriters
American sopranos
American soul keyboardists
American soul singers
Jazz musicians from California
Rhythm and blues pianists
Living people
Singers from Los Angeles
USC Thornton School of Music alumni
Women jazz pianists
20th-century American women singers
21st-century American women singers
20th-century American pianists
CAB (band) members
21st-century American keyboardists
21st-century American pianists
20th-century American keyboardists
Elektra Records artists
20th-century American singers
21st-century American singers
African-American songwriters
21st-century African-American women
Singer-songwriters from California
20th-century women pianists
21st-century women pianists